Dry Cottonwood Creek is a creek in Deer Lodge County, Montana. Sapphires are found along this creek.

Notes

Rivers of Montana
Tributaries of the Columbia River
Bodies of water of Deer Lodge County, Montana